St Martin-in-the-Fields is a painting of a child street vendor outside the church of St Martin-in-the-Fields in Trafalgar Square, London, painted by William Logsdail from 1888 in the collection of Tate Britain.

An engraving from the painting was published in The Graphic, 1894.

References 

1888 paintings
English paintings
Collection of the Tate galleries
Paintings of children